{{speciesbox
|image = Actinotus leucocephalus - Flickr - Kevin Thiele.jpg
|image_caption = A. leucocephalus (photo K.R.Thiele)
|genus = Actinotus
|species = leucocephalus
|authority = Benth.
|synonyms =Actinotus leucocephalus var. nanella O.H.Sarg.
Eriocalia leucocephala (Benth.) Heynh.Holotome leucocephala (Benth.) Walp.
|synonyms_ref=
|range_map = Actinotus leucocephalusDistMap8.png
|range_map_caption = Occurrence data from AVH
}}Actinotus leucocephalus is a small plant in the Apiaceae family, endemic to Western Australia.

DescriptionActinotus leucocephalus'' is an erect annual herb growing from 0.1 to 0.45 m high. Its white to cream flowers may be seen from September to December or from January to February. It grows on many different soils.

Taxonomy
It was first described by George Bentham in 1837.

References

External links
Actinotus leucocephalus occurrence data from Australasian Virtual Herbarium

leucocephalus
Eudicots of Western Australia
Taxa named by George Bentham
Plants described in 1837